Jiaya Jia (simplified Chinese: 贾佳亚) is a tenured professor of the Department of Computer Science and Engineering at The Chinese University of Hong Kong (CUHK). He is an IEEE Fellow, the associate editor-in-chief of one of IEEE’s flagship and premier journals- Transactions on Pattern Analysis and Machine Intelligence (TPAMI), as well as on the editorial board of International Journal of Computer Vision (IJCV).

Early life and education 
Jiaya Jia joined CUHK in 2004 as an assistant professor, and was promoted to associate and full professor in 2010 and 2015 respectively. He obtained his PhD degree in computer science jointly from Hong Kong University of Science and Technology and Microsoft Research in 2004. From March 2003 to August 2004, he was a visiting scholar at Microsoft. He conducted collaborative research at Adobe Research in 2007.

Career 
Jiaya Jia is a distinguished scientist in the fields of computer vision and artificial intelligence. His research team at CUHK, DV Lab, is one of the largest vision AI research teams in the world and has been making significant contribution to advanced development of computer vision algorithms and technologies with focuses on image/video understanding, detection and segmentation, multi-modal AI, computational imaging, practical optimization, and advanced learning for visual content since 2000. Jiaya Jia has published 200+ top papers and was cited 30,000+ times on Google Scholar. 40+ PhDs and fellows from this group are now active in academia and industry, and have become prominent AI tech leaders as professors, directors in major research labs, and founders of several successful startups.

Jiaya Jia assumes the position of associate editor-in-chief of IEEE Transactions on Pattern Analysis and Machine Intelligence (TPAMI) since 2021 and is the first associate editor-in-chief in 42 years since the journal was published. He is also on the editorial board of International Journal of Computer Vision (IJCV). Furthermore, Jiaya Jia has served as the area chair of ICCV, CVPR, AAAI, ECCV, and several other premium international AI conferences for years. He was on program committees of major conferences in graphics and computational imaging, including ICCP, SIGGRAPH, and SIGGRAPH Asia, as well as review committee for international authoritative journals.

Research 

The research areas of Jiaya Jia are computer vision, machine learning, and computational imaging, which includes Semantic segmentation and instance segmentation, image recognition and classification, 3D detection, segmentation and reconstruction, filtering, deblurring and super-resolution, motion estimation, depth estimation, and general image matching.

Jiaya Jia has made outstanding contributions to computer vision technology, algorithms and engineering, and is among the world's leading experts in the field. His research partners include numerous renowned multinational technology companies, such as Microsoft, Qualcomm, Adobe, Intel, NVIDIA, Amazon, Lenovo and Huawei. Jia has cultivated a number of outstanding talents with Master's and PhDs who continue to engage in scientific research and development in computer vision.

Many technologies in image analysis and processing developed by Jiaya Jia are still leading in the field worldwide. Wherein, his achievements in image deblurring, filtering, image sparse processing, multi-band image signal fusion and enhancement, large range motion estimation, texture and structure-based layering, etc. have been published in the industry's most influential conferences and publications, and implemented in the real-world applications. These achievements have demonstrated outstanding performance in established systems, and most of which are open source  so as to enable wider applications across industries such as aviation, medical imaging, safety management, robotic design, meteorological analysis and many more.

Selected publications 
In his over 20 years of research experience, Jiaya Jia has published 200+ top papers that have been cited more than 30,000 times. Call-for-use volume of his algorithm product interface has exceeded 50 million times daily.

According to CUHK Website in August 2021, Jiaya Jia has accumulatively published over 200 scientific papers in books, journals and conferences such as Motion Deblurring: Algorithms and Systems, Computer Vision – A Reference Guide, IEEE Transactions on Pattern Analysis and Machine Intelligence (TPAMI), International Journal of Computer Vision (IJCV) "Computer Vision and Pattern Recognition (CVPR)", and "European Conference on Computer Vision (ECCV)". Representative papers include:

 Jiaya Jia: Mathematical Models and Practical Solvers for Uniform Motion Deblurring (in Motion Deblurring: Algorithms and Systems), Cambridge University Press, ISBN 9781107044364, 2014;
 Jiaya Jia: “Matte Extraction” Book: Computer Vision - A Reference Guide, Springer,  Editor-in-chief: Ikeuchi, Katsushi;
 Jiaya Jia, Chi-Keung Tang：Image Stitching Using Structure Deformation，IEEE Transactions on Pattern Analysis and Machine Intelligence (TPAMI), Vol. 30, No. 4, 2008;
 Jiaya Jia, Jian Sun, Chi-Keung Tang, Heung-Yeung Shum：Drag-and-Drop Pasting，ACM Transactions on Graphics (also in SIGGRAPH 2006), Vol. 25, No. 3, 2006.
Xiaojuan Qi, Zheng zhe Liu, Renjie Liao, Philip HS Torr, Raquel Urtasun, Jiaya Jia：GeoNet++: Iterative Geometric Neural Network with Edge-Aware Refinement for Joint Depth and Surface Normal Estimation，IEEE Transactions on Pattern Analysis and Machine Intelligence (TPAMI). Accepted.

Selected honors and awards 

 Associate editor-in-chief of IEEE Transactions on Pattern Analysis and Machine Intelligence (TPAMI) since 2021, the associate editor-in-chief in 42 years since the journal was published;
 Area chair for CVPR 2021, AAAI 2021, and ICCV 2021;
 Area chair for CVPR 2020, AAAI 2020, and ECCV 2020;
 1st Place of WAD Drivable Area Segmentation Challenge 2018;
 1st Place of LSUN'17 Instance and Semantic Segmentation Challenges;
 1st Place of COCO Instance Segmentation Challenge 2017; 2nd Place in COCO Detection Challenge 2017;
 1st Place of ImageNet Scene Parsing Challenge 2016 with the paper PSPNet presented in CVPR 2017.

References 

Academic staff of the Chinese University of Hong Kong
Chinese computer scientists
Fellow Members of the IEEE
Machine learning researchers
Microsoft Research people
Artificial intelligence researchers
Living people
Year of birth missing (living people)